The English Hexapla is an edition of the New Testament in Greek, along with what were considered the six most important English language translations in parallel columns underneath, preceded by a detailed history of English translations and translators by S. P. Tregelles; it was first published in 1841. The six English language translations provided are Wycliffe's (1380), William Tyndale's (1534), Cranmer's (the Great Bible 1539), the Geneva Bible (1557), Rheims (1582), and the Authorised version, or King James Bible (1611), arranged in columns underneath.

The term "hexapla" signifies "six-fold" or "six-columned", and describes the arrangement of the six English versions underneath the Greek text in the book.  The term "hexapla" is also applied to Origen's 3rd-century edition of the Old Testament, which present six versions of the Old Testament, in Hebrew, Hebrew in Greek letters, Aquila of Sinope's Greek version, Symmachus the Ebionite's version, the LXX or Septuagint, and Theodotion's version.

The English Hexapla was published in 1841 by Samuel Bagster and Sons, of Paternoster Row, London, who are described on the title page as being a "warehouse for Bibles, New Testaments, Prayer-books, Lexicons, Grammars, Concordances, and Psalters, in ancient and modern languages."

Greek text
The Greek text used is that of Dr. M. A. Scholz, compiled between 1830 and 1836, but is itself based largely on the work of Griesbach, who published several editions of the Greek New Testament between 1775 and 1805.

Translation texts
The edition of Wycliffe's Bible is based on a manuscript belonging to the then late Duke of Sussex.

The edition of William Tyndale's translation is one revised and published by Tyndale himself in 1534, provided by the Baptist College in Bristol.

Cranmer's Bible is actually the Great Bible, with a preface written by Cranmer for the second edition in 1540.  The version in the English Hexapla is reprinted from a first edition of the Great Bible published in 1539, also provided by the Baptist College in Bristol.

The Geneva New Testament is reprinted from a first edition published in 1557.

The Rheims edition, also referred to as the "Anglo-Rhemish" translation, is reprinted from the original edition of 1582.  This is a Roman Catholic translation from the Vulgate, first published by the English College at Rheims in that year.

The Authorised version (or the King James Version) used is from a black letter (or gothic script) copy from the year 1611, provided by the Reverend John Henry Montagu Luxmoore.  The Authorised version underwent some revision in 1762 and 1769, with current Authorised versions being the 1769 Oxford University edition virtually unchanged.  Accordingly, the text of the Authorised version in the English Hexapla will show some changes in spelling, punctuation and typesetting, with a very few changes of words, over the 'modern' editions of the Authorised versions now available.

See also
Early Modern English Bible translations
 The following 6 translations are in the English Hexapla:
Wycliffe's Bible (Middle English translations from 1382 to 1395 based on Wycliffe's work c. 1380)
Tyndale's Bible (1526 with revisions in 1534 and 1536)
Great Bible (1539)
Geneva Bible (1557)
Douay–Rheims Bible (1582)
Authorized King James Version (1611)

References

External links
 The English Hexapla on archive.org

19th-century Christian texts
Polyglot bibles
Bible translations into English
New Testament editions